Lisa Tamsin Faulkner (born 19 February 1972) is an actress, presenter and television chef. She has had roles in The Lover (1992), Dangerfield (1995), Brookside (1997-1998), Holby City (1999-2001), Spooks (2002), Burn It (2003), Murder in Suburbia (2004-2005), New Street Law (2006-2007), Murdoch Mysteries (2010-2012), EastEnders (2017), The Girl Before (2021). 

Faulkner has also carved out a career as a television chef, having won Celebrity MasterChef as a contestant in 2010.

Early life

Faulkner was born in Merton, London, to David Faulkner and Julie (née Day). She lived in Esher and was educated at Tiffin Girls' School in Kingston upon Thames. When she was sixteen, her mother, Julie, died from throat cancer. Faulkner has since discussed her bereavement in a number of newspaper and magazine interviews.

Career

At the age of 16, Faulkner was approached by a modelling scout while she was waiting on the platform of a London tube station. 

In 1992, she made her first acting appearance in The Lover. At age 23, Faulkner played the part of Alison Dangerfield in the TV drama Dangerfield. She also starred in the 1995 film A Feast at Midnight. In 1996, she appeared in And The Beat Goes On. Two years later, she played Louise Hope in the Channel 4 soap Brookside. Between 1999 and 2001, she played Victoria Merrick in Holby City.

In the TV show Spooks, her character Helen Flynn was killed off in only the second episode of the first series, having her hand and face burnt in a deep fat fryer before being shot in the head at point-blank range. In 2004, she starred on ITV as D.S. Emma Scribbins ("Scribbs") in Murder in Suburbia, in which she played a CID policewoman in company with Caroline Catz, who played her boss, D.I. Ashurst. The show returned for a second series in 2005, with Scribbs adopting the then popular fashion style of "boho-chic". In 2006, she starred in the TV series New Street Law. From June 2008, Faulkner narrated the BBC One show Heir Hunters, replacing Nadia Sawalha, until 2017.

She regularly taught at Amanda Redman's Artists Theatre School. Faulkner was voted one of FHM's "100 Sexiest Women in the World" six times between 1999 and 2004. She regularly contributed to Big Brother's Little Brother, a magazine programme about the reality UK TV show Big Brother on Channel 4. She was also a regular contributor to the Sky1 magazine show Angela and Friends. 

In 2010, she won Celebrity Masterchef, beating Christine Hamilton and Dick Strawbridge in the final. She appeared in the third series premiere of the Canadian series Murdoch Mysteries when the series filmed an episode in and around Bristol, England, that was broadcast in 2010, and she returned for her second guest appearance in the fourth series in 2011. She also appeared twice in the fifth series. She co-hosted Real Food Family Cook Off on Channel 5 with Matt Dawson. The series was broadcast in 2011. In 2013, she co-hosted the daytime Channel 4 series What's Cooking? with Ben Shephard and, in 2015, was reunited with Shephard to co-host an episode of This Morning Summer. In March 2017, it was announced that she would be joining EastEnders as Fi Browning, a "stylish and sophisticated" businesswoman. Fi was later revealed to be Sophie Wilmott-Brown, the daughter of Kathy Beale's rapist James Willmott-Brown. In March 2019, Faulkner and John Torode were given a weekend cooking show. They host John And Lisa's Weekend Kitchen on Sunday mornings on ITV. In July 2019, Faulkner appeared on Celebrity Gogglebox alongside friend Nicola Stephenson.

Personal life

In 2005, Faulkner married Chris Coghill, her co-star from the TV series Burn It, in Richmond Park, London. The couple adopted a fifteen-month-old girl who was born in 2006. However, the couple separated and divorced in 2011, and she then married Australian chef John Torode. and they worked together on presenting John And Lisa's Weekend Kitchen.

Filmography

Awards and nominations

Books
 Recipes from my Mother for my Daughter (Simon & Schuster Ltd, 2013) 
 The Way I Cook... (Simon & Schuster Ltd, 2013) 
 Tea and Cake with Lisa Faulkner (Simon & Schuster Ltd, 2015) 
 From Mother to Mother: Recipes from a family kitchen (Simon & Schuster Ltd, 2018) 
 Meant to Be (Ebury Publishing, 2019)

References

External links

1972 births
Living people
20th-century English actresses
21st-century English actresses
English film actresses
English television actresses
English television presenters
English television chefs
People educated at the Tiffin Girls' School
People from Kingston upon Thames
Actresses from London
People from the London Borough of Merton
Reality cooking competition winners